The United States Senate special election of 1938 in New Jersey was held on November 8, 1938. 

The vacancy was created when incumbent Senator A. Harry Moore resigned to become Governor of New Jersey. Interim appointee John Gerald Milton did not run in the election.

Former Republican U.S. Senator William Warren Barbour returned to the Senate after defeating Democrat William H. J. Ely, the state administrator of the Works Progress Administration.

Democratic primary

Candidates
William H. J. Ely, administrator of the New Jersey WPA and former State Senator from Bergen County

Results

Republican primary

Candidates
William Warren Barbour, former U.S. Senator (1931–37)
C. Dan Coskey, candidate for Senate in 1936
George O. Pullen, supporter of Francis Townsend

Declined
Joseph Frelinghuysen, former U.S. Senator (1917–23) (endorsed Barbour)

Results

General election

Candidates
William Warren Barbour (Republican), former U.S. Senator (1931–37)
John C. Butterworth (Socialist Labor)
William H. J. Ely (Democrat), administrator of the New Jersey WPA
Louis H. Kelley (Prohibition)
William Norman (Communist)
John Palangio (Socialist)
Fred Turner (Townsend)

Results

See also 
1938 United States Senate elections

References

New Jersey 1938
New Jersey 1938
1938 Special
New Jersey Special
United States Senate Special
United States Senate 1938